Matthew Ronald Sparrow (born 3 October 1981) is an English former professional footballer who played as a midfielder

Sparrow made 440 appearances in the Football League across his 17-year-long playing career, notably 369 over two spells with Scunthorpe United, also appearing professionally for Brighton & Hove Albion, Crawley Town, Cheltenham Town and Lincoln City. He went on to play at non-league level for Gainsborough Trinity, before emigrating to Australia going on to feature semi-professionally for Sorrento, Joondalup United, Bayswater City and Fremantle City.

Club career

Scunthorpe United
Born in Wembley, London, Sparrow spent 11 years of his professional career at Scunthorpe United, playing in the bottom three tiers of league football for them. He formally signed for the club as a 16-year-old and played in the FA Youth Alliance final for Scunthorpe at the old Wembley stadium against West Bromwich Albion.

After spending several months in prison in 2001, he became a regular in the Scunthorpe first team. He was part of the team that won promotion to the Championship after finishing the 2006–07 season as champions. In August 2007, he was offered a new three-year contract with the club.

Sparrow scored twice in the 2008–09 League One Play-off Final at Wembley Stadium against Millwall, helping them to a 3–2 victory and promotion to the Championship.

Testimonial year
Sparrow made his 300th appearance for Scunthorpe in April 2009, and subsequently played in a testimonial match which took take place on 1 May. Former Scunthorpe striker Billy Sharp and veteran midfielder Peter Beagrie returned for the match. Also involved were Jack Cork, Alex Calvo Garcia, Jamie McCombe, Jamie Forrester, John Eyre, Lee Ridley, Paul Wilson, Steve Housham, Andy Butler, Mark Jackson, Martin Carruthers, Steve Torpey, Lee Hodges, Paul Harsley, Wayne Graves, Lee Turnbull, Tony Daws, Andy Crosby, Ian Baraclough, Cleveland Taylor, Chris Hope, Kevin Sharp, Kevin Pressman, Paul Musselwhite, Justin Walker, Ross Hyslop, Brian Quailey, Sam Beagrie, Des Comerford and Simon Elliott – plus managers Brian Laws and Nigel Adkins.

On 24 June 2010, it was reported that Sparrow had turned down a new contract offer and was looking elsewhere to continue his career.

Brighton & Hove Albion
On 29 June 2010, Sparrow signed for League One side Brighton & Hove Albion, penning a three-year contract. Brighton won the League One championship that season (in which Sparrow scored four goals) and were promoted to the Championship. In the 2011–12 season, Sparrow scored two goals, both in the 3–0 home win over Southampton. However, he received a red card and a three-match suspension in February's win against Leicester City, for a reckless sliding tackle.

Crawley Town
On 10 January 2013, Sparrow signed for League One and fellow Sussex side Crawley Town on a free transfer. Sparrow made his Crawley debut only two days later on 12 January, coming on in the 67th minute as a substitute replacing fellow midfielder Dannie Bulman, in a 2–0 defeat against Tranmere Rovers. He made his home debut on 2 February in a 1–1 draw against Swindon Town. He scored his first goal for the club on 9 February in a 2–1 defeat against his former club Scunthorpe United. He scored his second goal for the club in a 2–2 draw against Yeovil Town. He played 17 times for Crawley in the league that season, scoring three goals as they finished in 10th place, their highest-ever league placing.

Return to Scunthorpe United
Sparrow returned to his old club Scunthorpe United on 2 July 2013 after being released by Crawley Town. On 5 May 2015 it was announced that Sparrow wouldn't be offered a new deal and was free to leave the club.

Later career
On 24 June 2015, he signed a one-year deal with Conference Premier club Lincoln City and make his debut in a home game against Cheltenham Town.

In 2016, he emigrated to Western Australia and joined semi-professional club Sorrento.

On 6 October 2016, it was announced that Sparrow had signed with Gainsborough Trinity of the National League North. He made a total of 4 appearances for Gainsborough before returning to Australia.

Sparrow signed for Joondalup United for the 2017 National Premier Leagues season, where it was announced that he would also work in a coaching role.

Personal life
He attended the John Leggott College in Scunthorpe between 1998 and 2000, studying Leisure and Tourism.

Career statistics

Honours
Scunthorpe United
Football League One: 2006–07
Football League One play-offs: 2008–09

Brighton & Hove Albion
Football League One: 2010–11

References

External links

1981 births
Living people
Footballers from Wembley
Sportspeople from Scunthorpe
English footballers
Association football midfielders
Scunthorpe United F.C. players
Brighton & Hove Albion F.C. players
Crawley Town F.C. players
Cheltenham Town F.C. players
Lincoln City F.C. players
English Football League players